Freddie Strahan (born 21 December 1938 in Kilmainham, Dublin, Ireland) is an Irish former professional soccer player.  He is the only League of Ireland player to score for the Republic of Ireland against England during their 14 meetings since 1946.

Career
He played hurling with Kevin's Hurling Club until the age of sixteen and won a Dublin Minor Hurling Championship before he signed for Shelbourne F.C. in 1957. 

He won 5 caps for Ireland at senior international level. He represented the League of Ireland XI against Italy in May 1962.  His international debut was against Poland in a 3–1 defeat on 10 May 1964 in Kracow, and he scored against England two weeks later.

Strahan was awarded a benefit game in June 1966. He would later serve the club as secretary, director and briefly as manager in 1981.

He lives in Dublin, and received the title 'FAI Eircom Legend' at the Ireland v Poland match in November 2008, as an sign of honour.

Honours
League of Ireland: 1
 Shelbourne F.C. 1961–62
FAI Cup: 2
 Shelbourne F.C. 1960, 1963
Dublin Minor Hurling Championship: 1
 Kevins Hurling Club. 1956

References

Sources
The Complete Who's Who of Irish International Football, 1945–96 (1996):Stephen McGarrigle
Fitzpatrick, Seán Shelbourne Cult Heroes (2009, Colour Books) 

Republic of Ireland association footballers
Republic of Ireland international footballers
League of Ireland players
League of Ireland managers
Shelbourne F.C. players
St Patrick's Athletic F.C. players
1938 births
Living people
League of Ireland XI players
Shelbourne F.C. managers
Kevin's hurlers
Association football defenders
Republic of Ireland football managers